Events from the year 1970 in Kuwait.

Incumbents
Emir: Sabah Al-Salim Al-Sabah
Prime Minister: Jaber Al-Ahmad Al-Sabah

Births

 Deema Shehabi
 Jabir Al-Azmi
 Jamaan Al-Harbash
 30 March - Nahedh Al-Murdh.

Events

See also
Years in Jordan
Years in Syria

References

 
Kuwait
Kuwait
Years of the 20th century in Kuwait
1970s in Kuwait